Stanisław Tkocz (1936-2016) was an international speedway rider from Poland.

Speedway career 
Tkocz reached the final of the Speedway World Championship on two occasions in the 1961 Individual Speedway World Championship and the 1966 Individual Speedway World Championship.

He was a two times Polish champion after he won gold at the Polish Individual Speedway Championship in 1958 and 1965.

World final appearances

Individual World Championship
 1961 –  Malmö, Malmö Stadion - 15th - 3pts
 1966 –  Gothenburg, Ullevi – 9th – 7pts

World Team Cup
 1961 -  Wrocław, Olympic Stadium (with Marian Kaiser / Henryk Żyto / Mieczysław Połukard / Florian Kapała) - Winner - 32pts (4)
 1963 -  Vienna, Stadion Wien (with Henryk Żyto / Marian Kaiser / Joachim Maj / Andrzej Pogorzelski) - 4th - 7pts (1)
 1969 -  Rybnik, Rybnik Municipal Stadium (with Edward Jancarz / Andrzej Wyglenda / Henryk Glücklich / Andrzej Pogorzelski) - Winner - 31pts (4)

References 

1936 births
2016 deaths
Polish speedway riders